The Nigerian National Assembly delegation from Borno State comprises three Senators and ten Representatives.

8th Assembly (2015–2019)

7th Assembly (2011–2015)

6th Assembly (2007–2011)

The 6th National Assembly (2007–2011) was inaugurated on 5 June 2007.
Senators in the 6th Assembly were:

See also
Senate of Nigeria
Nigerian National Assembly

References

Politics of Borno State
National Assembly (Nigeria) delegations by state